Veneno Vivo is an album by Brazilian singer Cássia Eller, released in 1998.

Track listing 

"Brasil" 
"Amor Destrambelhado" 
"Obrigado (Por Ter Se Mandado)" 
"Vida Bandida" 
"Billy Negão" 
"Farrapo Humano" 
"Nós" 
"Mis Penas LLoraba Yo" 
"Todo Amor Que Houver Nessa Vida" 
"Ponto Fraco" 
"Faça O Que Quiser Fazer" 
"Geração Coca-Cola" 
"Todas As Mulheres Do Mundo" 
"Eu Queria Ser Cássia Eller"

References

Cássia Eller albums
1998 live albums
Universal Records live albums